Andreas Papadopoulos (1922-2009) was a Cypriot politician and engineer. He was Minister of Communications and Works in Cyprus from 16 August 1960  to 20 April 1966.

Life
Andreas Papadopoulos was born in Limasol in 1922. He was educated at Limmasol Greek Gymnasium and the School of Civil Engineers at Athens Technical University. After working as a civil engineer, he was appointed Minister of Communications and Works in Cyprus in 1960.

References

1922 births
2009 deaths
Greek Cypriot people
Cyprus Ministers of Communications and Works
Civil engineers
People from Limassol